Margit Nemesházi (née Markó; born 13 October 1943) is a Hungarian sprinter. She competed in the 100 metres at the 1964 Summer Olympics and the 1968 Summer Olympics.

References

1943 births
Living people
Athletes (track and field) at the 1964 Summer Olympics
Athletes (track and field) at the 1968 Summer Olympics
Hungarian female sprinters
Olympic athletes of Hungary
Athletes from Budapest
Olympic female sprinters